The Victoria Cross (VC) is a military decoration awarded for valour "in the face of the enemy" to members of armed forces of some Commonwealth countries and previous British Empire territories. It takes precedence over all other postnominals and medals. It can be awarded to a person of any rank in any service and civilians under military command, and is presented to the recipient by the British monarch during an investiture held at Buckingham Palace. It is the joint highest award for bravery in the United Kingdom with the George Cross, which is the equivalent honour for valour not "in the face of the enemy". The VC has been awarded on 1356 occasions to 1353 individual recipients.

The ribbon is crimson, 38 mm (1.5 inches) wide. The original (1856) specification for the award stated that the ribbon should be red for army recipients and blue for naval ones. However the dark blue ribbon was abolished soon after the formation of the Royal Air Force on 1 April 1918. On 22 May 1920 King George V signed a warrant that stated all recipients would now receive a red ribbon and the living recipients of the naval version were required to exchange their ribbons for the new colour.

There have been a total of 26 recipients of the VC who were serving in the Royal Air Force, including the Royal Air Force Volunteer Reserve, at the time of their valiant deed or deeds.  First World War VCs awarded to airmen in the Royal Flying Corps (13 in total) and the Royal Naval Air Service (2 in total) are not listed below, see the RN page for the RNAS recipients.  The vast majority of air force VCs awarded in a single conflict were for the Second World War, with the majority being won by Bomber Command aircrew and only one going to Fighter Command. Second World War dominion air force personnel under RAF command are not listed below.  Their tally is as follows: Royal New Zealand Air Force (3 awards), Royal Australian Air Force (2 awards), Royal Canadian Air Force (2 awards), South African Air Force (1 award).  Additionally, two Royal Navy Fleet Air Arm airmen won the VC during the Second World War, one of whom was attached from the Royal Canadian Navy.

All of the 26 men who won the VC while serving in the RAF were aircrew.  Although no RAF ground branch officers or tradesmen have ever won the VC while serving in the RAF, Group Captain F H Kirby, who was an RAF equipment officer, won the VC for his actions during the Second Boer War when he was a corporal in the Royal Engineers. No RAF personnel have been awarded the VC since the end of the Second World War.

Recipients

References
General

Specific

 *
Air Force
History of the Royal Air Force
Victoria Cross